Thyridectis is a genus of moths of the family Yponomeutidae.

Species
Thyridectis psephonoma - Meyrick, 1886 

Yponomeutidae